Vinod Goenka is an Indian real-estate developer. He is the Chairman and Managing Director of DB Realty Ltd, a large real estate development companies in Mumbai, India.

His net worth was US$1.18 billion as per Forbes magazine in 2010. He started off by joining his father's interior design and furniture company in Mumbai and helped expand it to form the Dynamix Group. Later, he partnered with the Balwa family to form DB Realty Ltd and build Le Royal Meridien Hotel Mumbai, near Mumbai's International Airport.

Personal life
Goenka resides in Mumbai, he is married to Aseela Goenka and has two children, a son and a daughter. He was an active member of the Young Presidents' Organization (YPO), graduating to become a member of the World Presidents Organisation (WPO) in 2009.

Early life
Born in 1959 in Calcutta (now Kolkata), he moved to Bombay at the age of 6 with his family beginning his education at Green Lawns High School. He then attended Jamnabai Naree School and Campion School in Fort later. He was national level athlete with a 100-meter sprint of 11.5 seconds, 200 meter sprint of 23.5 seconds and a long jump distance of 6.31 meters. Following a muscle injury, and unable to return to the track, Goenka began taking up other sports.

At the age of 23, Vinod Goenka started a tailoring shop with a group of his childhood friends in Juhu but soon moved on to looking after his father's business of interior design and furniture as his father had then moved on to Real Estate and Construction. At the age of 23-24, Goenka's father, Mr. K.M. Goenka bought Crystal Granite, a sick company on the verge of closing shop, and handed it over to his son to run and revive.

Business ventures

Dynamix Group
Goenka started his career at 23 years old by joining Conwood Constructions, the real estate business run by his father, expanding and transforming it into the Dynamix Group. The Dynamix Group has developed Gokuldham and Yashodham in Goregaon, Vasant Vihar in Thane, Mahavir Nagar in Kandivali and Shristi at Mira Road, in the Mumbai suburbs and 140- acre sea-side hill-station, Aldeia de Goa, at Bambolim Beach, Goa.

Crystal Granite and Marble Ltd
Goenka also established Crystal Granite and Marble Ltd, a 100% EOU for cutting and polishing high grade granite and marble.

Schreiber Dynamix Dairies Ltd
The Goenka family also owns and operates Schreiber Dynamix Dairies Ltd., one of the leading dairies in India, located in Baramati.

DB Group

DB Realty Ltd

In 2006, Vinod Goenka came together with Mr. Shahid Balwa from the Balwa Group, after a 9-year-long affiliation, in a joint venture to create the DB Realty Ltd (Dynamix Balwa Realty). DB Realty Ltd has been listed on both the National Stock Exchange and the Bombay Stock Exchange in 2010. DB Realty Ltd has developed over 25 projects in and around Mumbai and Pune. The company's notable projects include DB Crown, DB Orchid Heights, DB Woods, Orchid Suburbia and DB Ozone.

DB Hospitality

Mr. Goenka and Mr. Balwa initiated a diversification of the group into the hospitality sector under the DB Hospitality banner, constructing the Le Royal Meridien, Mumbai (now known as The Hilton International Airport Hotel, Mumbai). Operational for over 15 years, the hotel was the first venture undertaken by Goenka and Balwa as partners before the formation of DB Realty Ltd. DB Hospitality is also constructed the Hotel Grand Hyatt, Goa at Bambolim. The hotel is located on the same hillside that is owned by the Dynamix Group, Aldeia de Goa.

2G case
Goenka as DB's promoters also diversified into the telecom sector and were issued 2G licences, for Rs 1,537 crore (Rs billion), to operate in 15 circles. Later, they sold a 45 per cent stake in their telecom venture, Swan Telecom, to UAE-based Etisalat for nearly Rs 4,200 crore (Rs 42 billion).
Vinod Goenka was arrested on 20 April 2011 for his alleged role in the 2G spectrum case and was granted bail on 23 November 2011 by the Supreme Court.

In 2013, UAE telecoms operator Etisalat sued its Indian joint venture partners Vinod Goenka and Shahid Balwa for fraud after the Indian Supreme Court cancelled Goenka's 2G licenses as a part of the 2G spectrum case.

However, on 21 December 2017, Vinod Goenka and all 18 other accused persons in the 2G spectrum allocation case were acquitted of all charges levied against them. The judgment was passed by the Special Court of Honourable Mr Justice O.P. Saini.

References

Businesspeople from Mumbai
Rajasthani people
Indian billionaires
Living people
2G spectrum case
DB Group
1959 births
People charged with corruption